The Omaha Mavericks men's basketball team, also called the Nebraska–Omaha Mavericks, represents the University of Nebraska Omaha in Omaha, Nebraska, United States. The Mavericks compete in The Summit League. Led by head coach Chris Crutchfield, they play their games at the on-campus Baxter Arena, which they moved to at the start of the 2015–16 season. The 2015–16 season was also the first in which they were eligible for the NCAA tournament, NIT, or The Summit League tournament; they had been ineligible during the school's four-year transition from Division II to Division I, which began in the 2011–12 season. During this period, they made one appearance in the CIT, a tournament which is not directly sponsored by the NCAA, in 2014.

History

Season by season results

Postseason

NCAA Division II Tournament results
The Mavericks have appeared in 12 NCAA Division II Tournaments. Their combined record is 7–14.

NAIA tournament results
The Mavericks have appeared in the NAIA tournament one time. Their record is 0–1.

CIT results
The Mavericks have appeared in one CollegeInsider.com Postseason Tournament (CIT). Their record is 1–1.

CBI results
The Mavericks have appeared in one College Basketball Invitational (CBI). Their record is 0–1.

Notable players

All–Americans
1992: Phil Cartwright

All–Conference

All–NCC Team

1940: Ron Salyards, Forward
1941: Ron Salyards, Forward
1941: Robert Mathews, Guard
1942: Robert Mathews, Guard
1979: Derrick Jackson, Guard
1979: Rick Wilks, Forward
1981: Jim Gregory, Forward
1982: Dean Thompson, Guard
1983: Dean Thompson, Guard
1984: Dean Thompson, Guard

1983: Terry Sodawasser, Center
1986: Dwayne King, Guard
1987: Mark Miller, Guard
1988: Bryan Leach, Guard
1990: Trent Neal, Guard
1990: Phil Cartwright, Center
1991: Thor Palamore, Forward
1992: Phil Cartwright, Center
1996: John Skokan, Center
1999: Corey Griffin, Forward

2002: Alvin Mitchell, Guard
2002: Adam Wetzel, Center
2003: Adam Wetzel, Center
2004: Tola Dada, Forward
2004: Ty Graham, Forward
2005: Ryan Curtis, Forward
2005: Calvin Kapels, Guard
2005: Abdul Mills, Guard
2006: Calvin Kapels, Guard
2008: Michael Jenkins

All–MIAA Team
2009: Michael Jenkins
2010: Tyler Bullock & Andrew Bridger
2011: Tyler Bullock & Mitch Albers

All–Summit Team
2016: Tra-Deon Hollins
2017: Tra-Deon Hollins
2019: Mitch Hahn
2019: Zach Jackson

NCC Player of the Year
1984: Dean Thompson
2004: Tola Dada

NCC Freshman of the Year
2003: Ryan Curtis

UNO 1,000 Points/500 Rebounds club
Player (Years)           Points/Rebounds
Sam Singleton (1962–66)    1,101/508
Bill Haas (1964–67)        1,064/518
Pat Roehrig (1971–75)      1,006/640
Dennis Forrest (1973–77)   1,660/557
Glenn Moberg (1975–79)     1,077/531
Terry Sodawasser (1981–85) 1,093/625
Thor Palamore (1987–91)    1,309/476
Phil Cartwright (1988–92)  1,457/946
Tola Dada (2000–04)        1,017/583
Ryan Curtis (2002–06)      1,051/717
Calvin Kapels (2002–06)    1,102/571
John Karhoff (2010–2014)   1,348/524
Tre'Shawn Thurman (2014–17) 1,164/624

Notes

References

External links
 

 
1910 establishments in Nebraska
Basketball teams established in 1910